The 1895–96 Rugby Union County Championship was the eighth edition of  England's premier rugby union club competition at that time. The competition was reorganised with a reduction of groups from four to three, and the winners of the south-east and south-west groups competing in a play-off for the right to play the northern group winners in the final. This was the third format of the competition.

Yorkshire won the competition for the seventh time defeating Surrey in the final.

Group stage

Northern group

South-eastern group

South-western group

Southern Play Off match

Final

See also
 English rugby union system
 Rugby union in England

References

Rugby Union County Championship
County Championship (rugby union) seasons